VTV8 is TV Channel country region Central, Central highland region Vietnam. Channel VTV8 is broadcast with a duration of 24 hours a day, with rich content including programs news, categories, sports, entertainment built based on the materials and tastes of the audience in Central and Central highland in Vietnam. The official channel is broadcast from 00:00 on 1 January 2016 according to the approved National Press Planning Scheme, is the result of merging 3 TV channels regions of VTVbefore, including VTVHue, VTVDa Nang and VTVPhu Yen.

History

VTV Hue 
 Broadcast before 1975 with the original name of Television Hue.
 From 1975 to 1998, Radio Television Hue played the role of agency television of the province Thua Thien Hue.
 1 January 2004: The HVTV logo is used.
 1 January 2016: Dissolved together with VTVDa Nang and VTV Phu Yen to be equivalent to channel VTV8 nowadays.

VTV Da Nang 
Before 1975, it was the second largest city in the South, but Da Nang did not have a radio station, in the context of the South at that time there were five stations. located in Saigon, Can Tho, Nha Trang, Quy Nhon and Hue. People Quang Nam - Da Nang can only watch Radio Television Hue through the playback station located on the top of Hai Van Pass. Realizing the importance of the strategic position in terms of national defense, the economy and the development of the city Da Nang in the future, right from the first year of liberation, Mr. Vo Chi Cong, at that time was the Secretary of the Party Committee of Zone V, later the President and Mr. Ho Nghinh, Secretary of the Provincial Party Committee Quang Nam - Da Nang expressed his determination to build a station television right in the city Da Nang.
 
To realize that goal, the locality has made a wonderful preparation and received support from the officers, employees and technicians of Radio Television Saigon Liberation. (SGGP, now Ho Chi Minh City Television). Following the direction of the provincial leaders, in a short time, the broadcasting station on the top of the pass Hai Van was moved to the mountain Son Tra, many specialized machinery and equipment of the Radio Television SGGP was also moved to support Da Nang. Key staff and reporters, editors and cameramen of the Radio station mainly moved from the North and Zone 5. Newly recruited technicians and apprentices at SGGP Radio.
 
Less than two years after Da Nang liberation, from the chaos of war consequences, 14 February 1977, Radio Television Da Nang broadcast the first TV program, officially introduced to the audience Quang Nam - Da Nang. The station broadcasts 3 nights a week, 3 hours each, then upgraded to all weeknights with a full range of News, Little Flower, Art and feature film... July 1977, Radio Television Da Nang was transferred to the Committee Radio - Television.
 
In 1991, the transmitter was moved back to the city Da Nang because the broadcast in Son Tra was not guaranteed. However, due to the limitation of altitude, the radio coverage area is limited. To overcome, the radio has installed signal relay stations in Tam Ky and some mountainous districts to serve the people. In 1997, when Radio - Television Quang Nam was born to meet the information needs of the people of Quang Nam, Radio stopped the signal relay in Quang Nam.
 
Since 1994, Radio Television Da Nang officially changed to Vietnam Television Station, renamed TDN and on 1 January 2004 was renamed Television Vietnam Center in Da Nang city (DVTV, since the beginning of the year 2011 is VTV Danang). Since then, VTV Da Nang has been invested in many modern equipment and facilities to meet the requirements of rapid development of the television industry in the digital age. The team of reporters, editors and technicians is also increasingly supplemented in terms of quantity and quality of expertise. VTV Da Nang has quickly applied information technology and modern techniques to the production process, so the quality of content and images is increasingly improved, keeping up with the development of the industry. development of VTV.
 
In 1999, VTV Da Nang opened a permanent office in Gia Lai, then a resident office at Buon Ma Thuot was also invested in building. build.
 
Before 2016, in addition to producing the program TV, VTV Da Nang also took on the task of regional broadcasting and relaying the broadcast channels of [...] VTV. Every year, VTV Da Nang produces more than 100 programs including news bulletins, many categories, products of art, science, entertainment of the same class. variety of programs are selected, exploited from many sources to meet viewers requirements. In addition, VTVDa Nang also participates in production direct production of many major programs in the region such as: Coffee Festival Buon Me Thuot, Gong Festival Central Highlands, Quang Nam - Festival of Heritage Journeys, The Ceremony Danang International Fireworks Festival, the soccer awards, the sports tournaments in the area... VTVDa Nang is also the successful organizer of the events. VTV's programs and contests such as Sao Mai, Round K National Robocon festival and ABU Robocon 2013, 31st National Television Festival...
 
With VTV equipped with HD standard color car in 2015, the channel began to be broadcast in the picture format 16:9. From 1 January 1, 2016, implementing the scheme of system structure television, VTV Da Nang stopped broadcasting regionally and together with VTVHue, VTVPhu Yen produce programs for TV channel country VTV8. VTV Da Nang was also selected as the place to place the total control of VTV8 channel.
 
From May 10, 2020, Vietnamese Government promulgates Decree 34/2020/ND-CP amending and supplementing Article 3 of Decree No. 02 /2018/ND-CP dated January 4, 2018 of the Government stipulates the functions, tasks, powers and organizational structure of Vietnam Television. In which, all 3 centers Television Vietnam in Hue, Da Nang and Phu Yen (now the Center Television Vietnam area Central - Central Highlands) located in Da Nang city.

VTV Phu Yen 
Before 1989, Phu Yen was considered a white area for television. People in Phu Yen mainly watch the program of Television Quy Nhon station through Vung Chua Broadcasting Station. At that time, Radio Quy Nhon was in charge of the provinces Nghia Binh (Quang Ngai and Binh Dinh later), north [...] Phu Khanh (province|Phu Khanh]] (i.e. Phu Yen and Khanh Hoa today) and some provinces the Central Highlands.
 
To prepare for the re-establishment of the province Phu Yen on the basis of splitting into two provinces Phu Yen and Khanh Hoa on 1 July 1989 , from the beginning of 1989, Radio Television Nha Trang decided to establish a Broadcasting Station Phu Yen with personnel including: the late journalist Ta Tan Dong (Former Director of VTVPhu Yen), Tran Ngoc Dan, Nguyen To Ha, Le Anh Duong, Vo Minh Thuy. Officials of Radio Nha Trang were also appointed Phu Yen to install equipment and machinery for the Broadcasting Station and a technical center for the Radio Television Phu Yen (THPY).
 
Determining the establishment of THPY Radio is one of the important tasks, meeting the information requirements in the direction and administration of the province and the people's entertainment needs, dated 1 July 1989, the station was established on the basis of the Phu Yen Broadcasting Station, under extremely difficult circumstances in terms of funding, equipment, and reporters. That night, the station aired its first broadcast.
 
From broadcasting 3 times a week when it was first established, in 1991, the station broadcasts television daily on PTV channel. Due to the increase in broadcast time, in addition to self-produced programs, exchanging programs with other stations, PTV also pays great attention to the exploitation of programs by foreign stations via satellite. fine to compile and edit. In 1990, when VTVhad not yet covered the whole country, PTV exploited and compiled daily current news international news. June 6 of the same year, Radio held live commentary 1990 World Cup. In Central at that time, PTV was the only station broadcasting this event live. At the beginning of 1992, PTV aired the Mexican TV series Rich people also cry, then shared it with many other stations in the country to broadcast, creating a phenomenon television in Vietnam. This event was voted by the Southern press as 1 of 10 events cultural social typical of the year 1992.
 
Since 1994, PTV began to conduct live broadcast many important events. This is also the first local station in the country to broadcast live news bulletins, and one of the first to convert the archives and broadcasts from analog to digital. digital technology. Especially, since 1998, when PTV received key investment from the province Phu Yen and Vietnam Television, the station has developed rapidly in all aspects, becoming The brand has a place in the hearts of the audience not only locally but also regionally and nationally.
 
On August 22, 2001, Prime Minister Government signed the decision to become Establishment of Radio Television Area Phu Yen, later the Center of Vietnamese Literature in Phu Yen on the basis of transferring THPY Station managed by the province Phu Yen to Phu Yen Vietnam Television, acting as the unit television of the province as well as the region South Central Coast. With strong investment and requiring professional qualifications commensurate with national television stations in the region, the team of VTVPhu Yen is constantly growing in quantity and quality. In charge of producing programs for VTV in 6 provinces Binh Dinh, Phu Yen, Khanh Hoa, Ninh Thuan, Binh Thuan and Lam Dong.
 
After 14 years of broadcasting VTVPhu Yen, from 1 January 2016, VTVPhu Yen, with VTVHue and VTVDa Nang]merged into VTV8. In 2018, VTVestablished a Vietnamese Media Center at Nha Trang, Khanh Hoa (VTV Nha Trang), replacing the VTVPhu Yen ago.

VTV8 
On 1 January 2016, channel VTV8 was launched, on the basis of merging 3 regional channels: VTVHue, VTV Da Nang and VTVPhu Yen for the purpose of serving the audience in the Central region - Central Highlands, the signal is transmitted rapidly and widely throughout the provinces and cities directly under the Central - Central Highlands region.

Airtime duration

VTV Hue
Daily:
 2004 - 2014: 06h00 - 23:30.
 2015: 05:30 - 23:30.

VTV Da Nang
Daily:
 2004 – 2010: 06h00 – 23h00.
 2011 – End of 2015: 06h00 - 24h00.

VTV Phu Yen
 July – September 1989: 07h00 – 10:00, 12h00 – 15:00, 20h00 – 24h00
October 1989: 06:00–08:00, 10:00–12:00, 14:00–16:00, 18:00–20:00, 22:00
February 3, 1991 – August 9, 1999: Aired daily from 18:00–23:00.
From August 10, 1999: 08:00–12:00, 18:00–23:00.
2004 – 2010: 10:00–13:30, 17:00–23:00 (relaying VTV2 on channel 7 from 13:30 – 17:00).
 2011 – End of 2015: 06h00–24h00.

VTV8
 January 1, 2016 – April 4, 2016; January 1, 2019 - March 18, 2020; May 1, 2020 - July 29, 2020 and September 3, 2020 - now: 24 hours a day.
 April 5, 2016 – December 31, 2018; March 19 – April 30, 2020 and July 30 – September 2, 2020: 05h00–24h00 daily.

Programmes broadcast

See also
Da Nang
Hue
Vietnam Television
List of programmes broadcast by Vietnam Television

References

 

 
Television stations in Vietnam
2016 establishments in Vietnam
Television channels and stations established in 2016